The 2010 ITU Duathlon World Championships was a duathlon competition held in Edinburgh, Scotland from 3 to 5 September 2010 and organized by the International Triathlon Union (ITU). The championship course included a 10k run, a 38.4k bike, and a 5k run around the areas of Holyrood Park, Arthur’s Seat and the Scottish Parliament Building. General Electric was the title sponsor of the championship. Titles for amateur duathletes, elite paraduathletes, and elite duathletes were awarded during the three days of competition.

Results
Scotland native Catriona Morrison captured the overall women's elite title, her second following her 2006 win. Bart Aernouts took the men's elite title, leading the Belgium sweep of the podium spots.

Men

Elite championship

Under 23 elite

Women

Elite championship

Under 23 elite

References

External links

Complete 2010 results listing

World Championships
Duathlon World Championships
International sports competitions hosted by Scotland
Triathlon competitions in the United Kingdom